University Center is an unincorporated community in the U.S. state of Michigan.

The community encompasses two separate areas using the 48710 ZIP Code, including Delta College in Bay County and Saginaw Valley State University in Saginaw County.

History
University Center was established with a post office in September 1961, which was meant to exclusively serve the higher-education instutition of Delta College.  In September 1964, the University Center post office was expanded to include Saginaw Valley State University.

References

Unincorporated communities in Michigan
Unincorporated communities in Bay County, Michigan
Unincorporated communities in Saginaw County, Michigan
Populated places established in 1961
1961 establishments in Michigan
Education in Bay County, Michigan
Education in Saginaw County, Michigan